Bravo Team is a video game developed by Supermassive Games and published by Sony Interactive Entertainment for PlayStation 4 and its virtual reality headset PlayStation VR.

Gameplay

Development
Bravo Team was developed by Supermassive Games. It was announced for PlayStation VR along with The Inpatient. Development for the game lasted 13 months. Originally planned for release on December 5, 2017, it was delayed for March 6th, 2018.

Reception

Bravo Team debuted at number three in the UK sales charts for the week of March 10, 2018.

Bravo Team received negative reception from video game critics. Eurogamer's Ian Higton called the game "an astonishingly bad VR shooter from a team that should know better".

References

2018 video games
PlayStation 4 games
PlayStation 4-only games
PlayStation VR games
Single-player video games
Sony Interactive Entertainment games
Supermassive Games
Video games developed in the United Kingdom
Video games set in Europe